Mecyclothorax lewisensis is a species of ground beetle in the subfamily Psydrinae. It was described by Barry P. Moore in 1984.

References

lewisensis
Beetles described in 1984